The Savinja Statistical Region is a statistical region in Slovenia. The largest town in the region is Celje. It is named after the Savinja River. The region is very diverse in natural geography; it mainly comprises the wooded mountainous terrain attractive to tourists (the Upper Savinja Valley and part of the Kamnik–Savinja Alps), the fertile Lower Savinja Valley with good conditions for growing hops, the Kozje Hills, and the Velenje Basin with lignite deposits, used for electricity production. In 2013 the region invested more than EUR 127 million in environmental protection (the most of all regions). In 2013, the region accounted for 14% of enterprises created and 8% of enterprises shut down. The region has good natural conditions for agriculture. In 2013 this region had more than 11,000 farms, which is 15% of all farms in Slovenia, ranking the region right behind the Drava Statistical Region. In agricultural area utilised and livestock, the region was also in second place. The region is a well-known and popular tourist destination. In 2012, tourist arrivals and overnight stays in the region represented 11.1% of all tourist arrivals in Slovenia and 15.0% of all overnight stays. On average, tourists spent four nights there.

Cities and towns 
The Savinja Statistical Region includes 9 cities and towns, the largest of which is Celje.

Administrative divisions 
The Savinja Statistical Region comprises the following 31 municipalities:

 Braslovče
 Celje
 Dobje
 Dobrna
 Gornji Grad
 Kozje
 Laško
 Ljubno
 Luče
 Mozirje
 Nazarje
 Podčetrtek
 Polzela
 Prebold
 Rečica ob Savinji.
 Rogaška Slatina
 Rogatec
 Šentjur
 Slovenske Konjice
 Šmarje pri Jelšah
 Šmartno ob Paki
 Solčava
 Šoštanj
 Štore
 Tabor
 Velenje
 Vitanje
 Vojnik
 Vransko
 Žalec
 Zreče

The municipalities of Bistrica ob Sotli and the Radeče were part of the region until January 2015; they became part of the Lower Sava Statistical Region in 2015.

Demographics 
The population in 2020 was 263,322. It has a total area of 2,301 km².

Economy 
Employment structure: 51.8% services, 45.6% industry, 2.6% agriculture.

Tourism 
It attracts 10.4% of the total number of tourists in Slovenia, most being from Slovenia (52.8%).

Transportation 
 Length of motorways: 64.8 km
 Length of other roads: 5754.3 km

Sources 

 Slovenian regions in figures 2014

Statistical regions of Slovenia